Gunnar Asgeir Sadolin (5 February 1874 – 17 March 1955) was a Danish businessman.

Early life
Sadolin was born in Valløby, the son of parish priest Ole Jørgen Sadolin (1826–1908) and Louise Suzette Emilie Marcussen (1838–1906).

Sadolin passed the preliminary exams at the University of Copenhagen in 1890 and then worked for half a year in a mechanical workshop. He had aspirations to become an artist and therefore studied at Copenhagen Technical School, the Royal Danish Academy of Fine Arts and Kristian Zahrtmann's art school in 1890–96.

He was considered a promising student but temporary visual impairment led him into the theoretical and practical study of dyes. Burial finds in Egypt had recently brought attention to encaustic paintings, and this inspired him to conduct a series experiments successful with wax-based dyes.

In 1907, he established a small business, Gunnar A. Sadolins Farvefabrik (paint factory), with funding from his brothers Frode Sadolin and Jørgen Theophilus Sadolin and the physician Olav Høgsbro, who each invested DKK 100 in the venture. The production took place in a single room in Fasangården with Sadolin's fiancé and later wife as the only employee. On 18 May 1909, A/S Sadolin's Farver (Sadolin's Paints) was founded with merchant Gustav Hage (1852–1935) and engineer Alexander Foss (an uncle of Sadolin's fiancé) as the largest stakeholders. On 2 July 1912, the company merged with Holmblad & Co.s Eftf. under the name Sadolin & Holmblad. From 1914 Sadolin served as chief technical officer (teknisk direktør) of the company while his brother Knud Sadolin served as chief commercial officer (merkantil direktør) for the company. The product range was constantly expanded and A/S Kemisk Værk in Køge was established as a manufacturer of dry pigments and aniline dyes.

Gunnar Asgeir Sadolin and Knud Sadolin both retired in 1949 and were succeeded as directors by Gunnar Asgeir Sadolin's son Dan Alexander MacGregor Sadolin (21 July 1914 – 2 January 2000) and son-in-law Kaj Egeø Poulsen (1912-1993) and Knud Sadolin's son-in-law Orla Christian Greisen (1914-1994).

Personal life
Sadolin married Esther Margrethe Schultz (1 March 1888 - 13 October 1964) on 26 December 1910. She was a daughter of lighthouse master William Schultz (1850–1914) and Bertha Brøchner (1858–1921).

Sadolin owned a large collection of classical Dutch, Italian and Spanish art.

He died on 17 March 1955 and is buried in Valløby Cemetery.

References

External links

 Source

19th-century Danish businesspeople
20th-century Danish businesspeople
Danish manufacturing businesspeople
Danish company founders
People from Stevns Municipality
1874 births
1955 deaths